Elijah Johnson may refer to:

Elijah Johnson (agent) (1789–1849), American colonial agent
Elijah Johnson (basketball) (born 1990), American basketball player
Elijah Johnson (singer) (born 1998), American singer

Fictional characters
Elijah Johnson (Home and Away), a character in the soap opera Home and Away